The Choctaw Nation (Choctaw: Chahta Okla) is a Native American territory covering about , occupying portions of southeastern Oklahoma in the United States. The Choctaw Nation is the third-largest federally recognized tribe in the United States and the second-largest Indian reservation in area after the Navajo. As of 2011, the tribe has 223,279 enrolled members, of whom 84,670 live within the state of Oklahoma and 41,616 live within the Choctaw Nation's jurisdiction. A total of 233,126 people live within these boundaries, with its tribal jurisdictional area comprising 10.5 counties in the state, with the seat of government being located in Durant, Oklahoma. It shares borders with the reservations of the Chickasaw, Muscogee, and Cherokee, as well as the U.S. states of Texas and Arkansas. By area, the Choctaw Nation is larger than eight U.S. states.

The chief of the Choctaw Nation is Gary Batton, who took office on April 29, 2014, after the retirement of Gregory E. Pyle. The Choctaw Nation Headquarters, which houses the office of the Chief, is located in Durant. Durant is also the seat of the tribe's judicial department, housed in the Choctaw Nation Judicial Center, near the Headquarters. The tribal legislature meets at the Council House, across the street from the historic Choctaw Capitol Building, in Tuskahoma. The Capitol Building has been adapted for use as the Choctaw Nation Museum. The largest city in the nation had long been McAlester but was recently surpassed by Durant at the 2020 United States census.

The Choctaw Nation is one of three federally recognized Choctaw tribes; the others are the sizable Mississippi Band of Choctaw Indians, with 10,000 members and territory in several communities, and the Jena Band of Choctaw Indians in Louisiana, with a few hundred members. The latter two bands are descendants of Choctaw who resisted the forced relocation to Indian Territory. The Mississippi Choctaw preserved much of their culture in small communities and reorganized as a tribal government in 1945 under new laws after the Indian Reorganization Act of 1934.

Those Choctaw who removed to the Indian Territory, a process that went on into the early 20th century, are federally recognized as the Choctaw Nation of Oklahoma.  The removals became known as the "Trail of Tears."

The original territory has expanded and shrunk several times since the 19th century.

Terminology

In English, the official name for the area was "Choctaw Nation", as outlined in Article III of the 1866 Reconstruction Treaty following the Civil War. During its time of sovereignty within the United States Indian Territory, it also utilized the title "Choctaw Republic". Since 1971, it is officially referred to as the Choctaw Nation of Oklahoma. The Choctaw Nation maintains a special relationship with both the federal and Oklahoma governments.

Officially a domestic dependent nation since 1971, in July 2020, the Supreme Court ruled in McGirt v. Oklahoma that the eastern area of Oklahoma- about half of the modern state- never lost its status as a Native reservation. This includes the city of Tulsa (located between Muscogee and Cherokee territory). The area includes lands of the Chickasaw, Choctaw, Cherokee, Muscogee and Seminole. Among other effects, the decision potentially overturns convictions of over a thousand cases in the area involving tribe members convicted under state laws. The ruling is based on an 1832 treaty, which the court ruled was still in force, adding that "Because Congress has not said otherwise, we hold the government to its word." As such, the Choctaw Nation returned from a domestic dependent nation status to that of an Indian reservation.

Geography

Atoka County, 
most of Bryan County, 
Choctaw County, 
most of Coal County, 
Haskell County, 
half of Hughes County, 
a portion of Johnston County, 
Latimer County, 
Le Flore County, 
McCurtain County, 
Pittsburg County,
a portion of Pontotoc County, and 
Pushmataha County.

Government

The Tribal Headquarters are located in Durant. Opened in June 2018, the new headquarters is a 5-story, 500,000 square foot building located on an 80-acre campus in south Durant. It is near other tribal buildings, such as the Regional Health Clinic, Wellness Center, Community Center, Child Development Center, and Food Distribution. Previously, headquarters was located in the former Oklahoma Presbyterian College, with more offices scattered around Durant. The current chief is Gary Batton and the assistant chief is Jack Austin, Jr. The Tribal Council meets monthly at Tvshka Homma.

The tribe is governed by the Choctaw Nation Constitution, which was ratified by the people on June 9, 1984. The constitution provides for an executive, a legislative and a judicial branch of government. The chief of the Choctaw Tribe, elected every four years, is not a voting member of the Tribal Council. These members are elected from single-member districts for four-year terms. The legislative authority of the tribe is vested in the Tribal Council, which consists of twelve members.

Citizenship in the Choctaw Nation is outlined in Article II Section I of the constitution which states that membership is for "Choctaw Indians by blood whose names appear on the final rolls of the Choctaw Nation approved pursuant to Section 2 of the Act of April 26, 1906, and their lineal descendant." The constitution cannot be amended without a vote of tribal members and currently excludes Choctaw freedmen. A constitutional amendment can be passed through "two methods: (1) a proposal of Tribal Council requiring 8 affirmative votes and/or (2) by a petition containing the entire text of the amendment and signed by no less than 30 percent of the total number of qualified voters voting in the last Chief's election." While the current Chief, Gary Batton, disagrees that denying citizenship to the freedmen is a race issue, this ignores the historical racist legacy of the Dawes Rolls. Also, because the Nation, along with the other Five Civilized Tribes, supported the Confederacy during the U.S. Civil War, they severed ties with the federal government, making the U.S. require these tribes to make new peace treaties, emancipate their slaves, and offer full citizenship. Numerous families had intermarried by that time or had other personal ties to the tribe as well, but the Choctaw Nation did not uphold the Treaty of 1866. Some like Chief Batton and Dr. Blue Clarke, a Muscogee Nation citizen and a professor of Indigenous Law at Oklahoma City University, claim it is an issue about tribal sovereignty, though it's only within the last 50 years that they have not been recognized as citizens. The "Freedmen were adopted in as part of the tribe in 1885" but in "1983, the Choctaw Nation added a 'by-blood' requirement into the constitution that excluded many." While tribal sovereignty at times seeks for the tribe to be treated like a country with similar rights, tribes have "treaty relationships with the United States, which makes that relationship part of the foundational fabric of the U.S. government" and the Five Tribes also made agreements with the government after losing in the Civil War when they sided with the Confederacy. For many Choctaw Freedmen, it is about getting the tribe to acknowledge its participation in chattel slavery through Native American slave ownership. The citizenship definition of many tribal nations runs counter to how other countries or nations define their citizenship (based on borders, birth location, naturalization, instead of descendance, race, or ethnicity), and most federally recognized tribes are subject to the U.S. Government's final acceptance.

The General Fund Operating Budget, the Health Systems Operating Budget, and the Capital Projects Budget for the fiscal year beginning October 1, 2017, and ending September 30, 2018, was $516,318,568.

Politically, the Choctaw Nation is completely encompassed by Oklahoma's 2nd congressional district, represented by Republican Josh Brecheen, himself a Choctaw citizen. With a majority of both Native American and white voters in the region leaning conservative, Republican Donald Trump carried every county in the Choctaw Nation in the 2020 election, as well as every county in the state of Oklahoma, continuing a trend seen in the 2004, 2008, 2012 and 2016 elections. The Choctaw Nation is located in one of the most conservative areas of Oklahoma, and while registered Democrats outnumber Republicans, the region has consistently gone to Republican candidates. The current head of the government, Chief Gary Batton, is a Republican.

The Choctaw Nation also has the right to appoint a non-voting delegate to the U.S. House of Representatives, per the 1830 Treaty of Dancing Rabbit Creek; as of 2020 however, no delegate has been named or sent to the Congress by the Choctaw Nation. Chief Gary Batton is said to be observing the process of the Cherokee Nation nominating their treaty-stipulated delegate to the U.S. House before proceeding.

Executive Department
The supreme executive power of the Choctaw Nation is assigned to a chief magistrate, styled as the "Chief of the Choctaw Nation". The Assistant Chief is appointed by the Chief with the advice and consent of the Tribal Council, and can be removed at the discretion of the Chief. The current Chief of the Choctaw Nation is Gary Batton, and the current Assistant Chief is Jack Austin, Jr.

The Chief's birthday (Batton's is December 15) is a tribal holiday.

In 2021, the tribal council instituted October 16 as Choctaw Flag Day, a holiday to celebrate the adoption of the Choctaw Nation Seal on October 16, 1860.

History
Before Oklahoma was admitted to the union as a state in 1907, the Choctaw Nation was divided into three districts: Apukshunnubbee, Moshulatubbee, and Pushmataha. Each district had its own chief from 1834 to 1857; afterward, the three districts were put under the jurisdiction of one chief. The three districts were re-established in 1860, again each with their own chief, with a fourth chief to be Principal Chief of the tribe. These districts were abolished at the time of statehood, as tribal government and land claims were dissolved in order for the territory to be admitted as a state. The tribe later reorganized to re-establish its government.

List of Chiefs

Legislative department
The legislative authority is vested in the Tribal Council. Members of the Tribal Council are elected by the Choctaw people, one for each of the twelve districts in the Choctaw Nation.

The Tribal council members are the voice and representation of the Choctaw people in the tribal government. In order to be elected as council members, candidates must have resided in their respective districts for at least one year immediately preceding the election and must be at least one-fourth Choctaw Indian by blood and at least twenty-one years of age. Once elected, council members must remain a resident of their district during the term in office.

Once in office, the Tribal council members have regularly scheduled county council meetings. The presence of these tribal leaders in the Indian community creates a sense of understanding of their community and its needs. The Tribal Council is responsible for adopting rules and regulations which govern the Choctaw Nation, for approving all budgets, decisions concerning the management of tribal property, and all other legislative matters. The Tribal Council assists the community to implement an economic development strategy and to plan, organize, and direct Tribal resources to achieve self-sufficiency.

Judicial department
The judicial authority of the Choctaw Nation is assigned to the Court of General Jurisdiction (which includes the District Court and the Appellate Division) and the Constitutional Court. The Constitutional Court consists of a three-member court, who are appointed by the Chief. At least one member, the presiding judge (Chief Justice), must be a lawyer licensed to practice before the Supreme Court of Oklahoma.

Members
Constitutional Court
Chief Justice David Burrage
Judge Mitch Mullin
Judge Frederick Bobb
Appellate Division
Presiding Judge Pat Phelps
Judge Bob Rabon
Judge Warren Gotcher
District Court
Presiding District Judge Richard Branam
District Judge Mark Morrison
District Judge Rebecca Cryer

Government Treaties
The Choctaw underwent many changes to their government since its first interactions with the United States. The Choctaw Nation acknowledges these treaties and categorizes them by “Pre-Removal Treaties” and “Post-Removal Treaties”.

Economy 
The Choctaw Nation's annual tribal economic impact in 2010 was over $822,280,105. The tribe employs nearly 8,500 people worldwide; 2,000 of those work in Bryan County, Oklahoma. The Choctaw Nation is also the largest single employer in Durant. The nation's payroll is about $260 million per year, with total revenues from tribal businesses and governmental entities topping $1 billion.

The nation has contributed to raising Bryan County's per capita income to about $24,000. The Choctaw Nation has helped build water systems and towers, roads and other infrastructure, and has contributed to additional fire stations, EMS units and law enforcement needs that have accompanied economic growth.

The Choctaw Nation operates several types of businesses. It has seven casinos, 14 tribal smoke shops, 13 truck stops, and two Chili's franchises in Atoka and Poteau. It also owns a printing operation, a corporate drug testing service, hospice care, a metal fabrication and manufacturing business, a document backup and archiving business, and a management services company that provides staffing at military bases, embassies and other sites, among other enterprises.

Health system 

The Choctaw Nation is the first indigenous tribe in the United States to build its own hospital with its own funding. The Choctaw Nation Health Care Center, located in Talihina, is a  health facility with 37 hospital beds for inpatient care and 52 exam rooms. The $22 million hospital is complete with $6 million worth of state-of-the-art equipment and furnishing. It serves 150,000–210,000 outpatient visits annually. The hospital also houses the Choctaw Nation Health Services Authority, the hub of the tribal health care services of Southeastern Oklahoma.

The tribe also operates eight Indian clinics, one each in Atoka, Broken Bow, Durant, Hugo, Idabel, McAlester, Poteau, and Stigler.

2008 Secretary of Defense Employer Support Freedom Award 

The Choctaw Nation of Oklahoma has participated in a great deal of help for those outside of their nation. In fact, they took part in helping United States troops overseas. They did this by putting together care packages. Their total of packages sent out were close to 3,500. These packages were sent to troops throughout Iraq and Afghanistan.

The United States Department of Defense has an award called the Secretary of Defense Employer Support Freedom Award. This award is the highest recognition given by the U.S. Government to employers for their outstanding support of employees who serve in the National Guard and Reserve. The executive Director of the National Committee for Employer Support of the Guard and Reserve, Dr. L. Gordon Sumner Jr., said, "We are pleased and excited to announce Choctaw Nation of Oklahoma as a recipient of the 2008 Secretary of Defense Employer Support Freedom Award. The tremendous support Choctaw Nation of Oklahoma provides for Guard and Reserve employees and their families is exemplary and helps our citizen warriors protect our nation without concern for their jobs."

The Choctaw Nation was one of 15 recipients of that year's Freedom Award, selected from 2,199 nominations. Its representatives received the award September 18, 2008, in Washington, D.C. They received the award based on their large employer status with the National Guard and Reserves. The Choctaw Nation is the first Native American tribe to receive this award.

“Oklahomans who serve our country do so at tremendous personal expense and risk. The Choctaw Nation has gone above and beyond to support those men and women,” said Sen. Jay Paul Gumm. “They are a shining example of how employers and communities can go that extra mile for our military personnel.”

History

Treaty of Dancing Rabbit Creek (1830)

The Choctaw were recognized as a sovereign nation under the protection of the United States with the Treaty of Hopewell in 1786. They were militarily aligned with the United States during the American Revolutionary War, Northwest Indian War, Creek Civil War, and the War of 1812. However, relations soured following the election of Andrew Jackson. At Jackson's personal request, the United States Congress opened a fierce debate on an Indian Removal Bill. In the end, the bill passed, but the vote was very close: The Senate passed the measure, 28 to 19, while in the House it passed, 102 to 97. Jackson signed the legislation into law June 30, 1830, and turned his focus onto the Choctaw in Mississippi Territory.

On August 25, 1830, the Choctaws were supposed to meet with Jackson in Franklin, Tennessee, but Greenwood Leflore, a district Choctaw chief, informed Secretary of War John H. Eaton that the warriors were fiercely opposed to attending. Jackson was angered. Journalist Len Green writes "although angered by the Choctaw refusal to meet him in Tennessee, Jackson felt from LeFlore's words that he might have a foot in the door and dispatched Secretary of War Eaton and John Coffee to meet with the Choctaws in their nation." Jackson appointed Eaton and General John Coffee as commissioners to represent him to meet the Choctaws at the Dancing Rabbit Creek near present-day Noxubee County, Mississippi.

The commissioners met with the chiefs and headmen on September 15, 1830, at Dancing Rabbit Creek. In carnival-like atmosphere, the policy of removal was explained to an audience of 6,000 men, women, and children. The Choctaws would now face migration or submit to US law as citizens. The treaty would sign away the remaining traditional homeland to the US; however, a provision in the treaty made removal more acceptable:

On September 27, 1830, the Treaty of Dancing Rabbit Creek was signed. It represented one of the largest transfers of land that was signed between the US government and Native Americans without being instigated by warfare. By the treaty, the Choctaws signed away their remaining traditional homelands, opening them up for European-American settlement. The Choctaw were the first to walk the Trail of Tears. Article XIV allowed for nearly 1,300 Choctaws to remain in the state of Mississippi and to become the first major non-European ethnic group to become US citizens. Article 22 sought to put a Choctaw representative in the U.S. House of Representatives. The Choctaw at this crucial time split into two distinct groups: the Choctaw Nation of Oklahoma and the Mississippi Band of Choctaw Indians. The nation retained its autonomy, but the tribe in Mississippi submitted to state and federal laws.

{{blockquote|To the voters of Mississippi. Fellow Citizens:-I have fought for you, I have been by your own act, made a citizen of your state; ... According to your laws I am an American citizen, ... I have always battled on the side of this republic ... I have been told by my white brethren, that the pen of history is impartial, and that in after years, our forlorn kindred will have justice and "mercy too" ... I wish you would elect me a member to the next Congress of the [United] States.-Mushulatubba, Christian Mirror and N.H. Observer, July 1830.
}}

Reservation establishment in Oklahoma (1830-1860)
The Indian Removal Act, a law implementing Removal Policy, was signed by President Andrew Jackson on May 28, 1830. The act delineated Indian Territory, where the U.S. federal government forcibly relocated tribes from across the United States, including Indigenous peoples of the Southeastern Woodlands (such as the Natchez, Yuchi, Cherokee, Chickasaw, Choctaw, Muscogee and Seminole). The forced relocation of the Choctaw Nation in 1831 is called the Trail of Tears. In 1834, U.S. Congress defined the first Indian Territory, with the Five Civilized Tribes occupying the land that eventually became the State of Oklahoma, excluding its panhandle.

Influence of Cyrus Kingsbury's Choctaw Mission (1840)
The Reverend Cyrus Kingsbury, who had ministered among the Choctaw since 1818, accompanied the Choctaws from the Mayhew Mission in Oktibbeha County, Mississippi, to their new location in Indian Territory. He established the church in Boggy Depot in 1840. The church building was the temporary capitol of the Choctaw Nation in 1859. Allen Wright (principal chief of the Choctaw Republic from late 1866 to 1870) lived much of his early life with Kingsbury at Doaksville and the mission school at Pine Ridge. Armstrong Academy was founded in Chahta Tamaha, Indian Territory as a school for Choctaw boys in 1844. It was named after William Armstrong, a popular agent of the Choctaws.

Great Irish Famine aid (1847)

Midway through the Great Irish Famine (1845–1849), a group of Choctaw collected $170 ($ in current dollar terms) and sent it to help starving Irish men, women and children. "It had been just 16 years since the Choctaw people had experienced the Trail of Tears, and they had faced starvation... It was an amazing gesture. By today's standards, it might be a million dollars," wrote Judy Allen in 1992, editor of the Choctaw Nation of Oklahoma's newspaper, Bishinik. To mark the 150th anniversary, eight Irish people came to the US to retrace the Trail of Tears to raise money for Somalian relief. (Following publication of Angie Debo's The Rise and Fall of the Choctaw Republic, various articles corrected the cited amount of this donation, saying it was $170 ($).)

In 2015 a sculpture known as Kindred Spirits was erected in the town of Midleton, County Cork, Ireland to commemorate the Choctaw Nation's donation. A delegation of 20 members of the Choctaw Nation attended the opening ceremony along with the County Mayor of Cork.

In 2018 Irish Taoiseach (Prime Minister) Leo Varadkar announced the Choctaw-Ireland Scholarship Programme - an opportunity for Choctaw students to study in Ireland. The program was launched "in recognition of the act of generosity and humanitarianism shown by the Choctaw Nation of Oklahoma towards the people of Ireland during the Great Famine of the mid-Nineteenth Century, and to foster and deepen the ties between the two nations today". However, the programme is only available for postgraduate students, and those studying at Cork University; within the disciplines of Art, Social Sciences or Celtic Studies.

Controversy over Slaveholding and separation from Chickasaw Nation (1855)

In Spring 1855, the ABCFM sent Dr. George Warren Wood to visit the Choctaw Mission in Oklahoma to resolve a crisis over the abolition issue. After arriving in Stockbridge Mission, Wood spent over two weeks days visiting missions including the Goodwater Mission, Wheelock Academy, Spencer Academy, and other mission schools. He met with missionaries to discuss Selah B Treat's June 22, 1848, letter permitting them to maintain fellowship with slaveholders. Ultimately, the crisis was not resolved, and by 1859, the Board cut ties to the Choctaw mission altogether.

In 1855, the Choctaw and Chickasaw Nations formally separated. Doaksville served as the capital of the Choctaw Nation between 1860 and 1863. An 1860 convention in Doaksville ratified the Doaksville Constitution that guided the Choctaw Nation until 1906. The capital moved to Mayhew Mission in 1859, then to Chahta Tamaha in 1863. The Oklahoma Historical Society claims that Doaksville began to decline in importance in 1854, when the U.S. Army abandoned Fort Towson.

American Civil War in Indian Territory (1861-65)

The Choctaws sided with the South during the Civil War. Tribal members had become successful cotton planters—owning many slaves. The most famous Choctaw planter was Robert M. Jones. He was part Choctaw and had become influential in politics. Jones eventually supported the Confederacy and became a non-voting member in the Confederacy's House of Representatives. Jones was key for steering the Choctaw Nation in an alliance with the Confederacy. By 1860, the Choctaw Nation lived in a relatively calm and remote society. Many Indian citizen members had become successful farmers, planters, and business men. Angie Debo, author of The Rise and Fall of the Choctaw Republic, wrote: "Taken as a whole the generation from 1833 to 1861 presents a record of orderly development almost unprecedented in the history of any people."

Territory transition to statehood (1900)

By the early twentieth century, the United States government had passed laws that reduced the Choctaw's sovereignty and tribal rights in preparation for the extinguishing of land claims and for Indian Territory to be admitted, along with Oklahoma Territory, as part of the State of Oklahoma.

Under the Dawes Act, in violation of earlier treaties, the Dawes Commission registered tribal members in official rolls. It forced individual land allotments upon the Tribe's heads of household, and the government classified land beyond these allotments as "surplus", and available to be sold to both native and non-natives. It was primarily intended for European-American (white) settlement and development.

The government created "guardianship" by third parties who controlled allotments while the owners were underage. During the oil boom of the early 20th century, the guardianships became very lucrative; there was widespread abuse and financial exploitation of Choctaw individuals. Charles Haskell, the future governor of Oklahoma, was among the white elite who took advantage of the situation.

An Act of 1906 spelled out the final tribal dissolution agreements for all of the five civilized tribes and dissolved the Choctaw government. The Act also set aside a timber reserve, which might be sold at a later time; it specifically excluded coal and asphalt lands from allotment. After Oklahoma was admitted as a state in 1907, tribal chiefs of the Choctaw and other nations were appointed by the Secretary of the Interior.

Pioneering the use of code talking (1918)
During World War I the American army fighting in France became stymied by the Germans' ability to intercept its communications.  The Germans successfully decrypted the codes, and were able to read the Americans' secrets and know their every move in advance.

Several Choctaw serving in the 142nd Infantry suggested using their native tongue, the Choctaw language, to transmit army secrets. The Germans were unable to penetrate their language. This change enabled the Americans to protect their actions and almost immediately contributed to a turn-around on the Meuse-Argonne front. Captured German officers said they were baffled by the Choctaw words, which they were completely unable to translate.  According to historian Joseph Greenspan, the Choctaw language did not have words for many military ideas, so the code-talkers had to invent other terms from their language. Examples are "'big gun' for artillery, 'little gun shoot fast' for machine gun, 'stone' for grenade and 'scalps' for casualties." Historians credit these soldiers with helping bring World War I to a faster conclusion.

There were fourteen Choctaw Code Talkers. The Army repeated the use of Native Americans as code talkers during World War II, working with soldiers from a variety of American Indian tribes, including the Navajo. Collectively the Native Americans who performed such functions are known as code talkers.

Citizenship (1920s)
The Burke Act of 1906 provided that tribal members would become full United States citizens within 25 years, if not before. In 1928 tribal leaders organized a convention of Choctaw and Chickasaw tribe members from throughout Oklahoma. They met in Ardmore to discuss the burdens being placed upon the tribes due to passage and implementation of the Indian Citizenship Act and the Burke Act. Since their tribal governments had been abolished, the tribes were concerned about the inability to secure funds that were due them for leasing their coal and asphalt lands, in order to provide for their tribe members. Czarina Conlan was selected as chair of the convention. They appointed a committee composed of Henry J. Bond, Conlan, Peter J. Hudson, T.W. Hunter and Dr. E. N Wright, for the Choctaw; and Ruford Bond, Franklin Bourland, George W. Burris, Walter Colbert and Estelle Ward, for the Chickasaw to determine how to address their concerns.

After meeting to prepare the recommendation, the committee broke with precedent when it sent Czarina Conlan (Choctaw) and Estelle Chisholm Ward (Chickasaw) to Washington to argue in favor of passage of a bill proposed by U.S. House Representative Wilburn Cartwright. It proposed sale of the coal and asphalt holdings, but continuing restrictions against sales of Indian lands. This was the first time that women had been sent to Washington as representatives of their tribes.

Termination efforts (1950s)
From the late 1940s through the 1960s, the federal government pursued an Indian termination policy, to end the special relationship of tribes. Retreating from the emphasis of self-government of Indian tribes, Congress passed a series of laws to enable the government to end its trust relationships with native tribes. On 13 August 1946, it passed the Indian Claims Commission Act of 1946, Pub. L. No. 79-726, ch. 959. Its purpose was to settle for all time any outstanding grievances or claims the tribes might have against the U.S. for treaty breaches (which were numerous), unauthorized taking of land, dishonorable or unfair dealings, or inadequate compensation on land purchases or annuity payments. Claims had to be filed within a five-year period.

Most of the 370 complaints submitted were filed at the approach of the 5-year deadline in August 1951.

In 1946, the government had appropriated funds for the sale of Choctaw tribal coal and asphalt resources. Though the Choctaw won their case, they were charged by the courts with almost 10% of the $8.5 million award in administrative fees. In 1951, the tribe took advantage of the new law and filed a claim for over $750,000 to recover those fees.

When Harry J. W. Belvin was appointed chief of the Choctaw in 1948 by the Secretary of the Interior, he realized that only federally recognized tribes were allowed to file a claim with the Commission. If he wanted to get that money back, his tribe needed to reorganize and re-establish its government. He created a democratically elected tribal council and a constitution to re-establish a government, but his efforts were opposed by the Area Director of the Bureau of Indian Affairs.

Ultimately, the Choctaw filed a claim with the Claims Commission on a technicality in 1951. The suit was classified as a renewal of the 1944 case against the US Court of Claims, but that did not stop the antagonism between Belvin and the area BIA officials. The BIA had had management issues for decades. Poorly trained personnel, inefficiency, corruption, and lack of consistent policy plagued the organization almost from its founding. For Belvin, relief from BIA oversight of policies and funds seemed as if it might enable the Choctaw to maintain their own traditional ways of operating and to reform their own governing council.

After eleven years as Choctaw chief, Belvin persuaded Representative Carl Albert of Oklahoma to introduce federal legislation to begin terminating the Choctaw tribe. On 23 April 1959, the BIA confirmed that H.R. 2722 had been submitted to Congress at the request of the tribe. It would provide for the government to sell all remaining tribal assets, but would not affect any individual Choctaw earnings. It also provided for the tribe to retain half of all mineral rights, to be managed by a tribal corporation.

On 25 August 1959, Congress passed a bill to terminate the tribe; it was called "Belvin's law" because he was the main advocate behind it. Belvin created overwhelming support for termination among tribespeople through his promotion of the bill, describing the process and expected outcomes. Tribal members later interviewed said that Belvin never used the word "termination" for what he was describing, and many people were unaware he was proposing termination. The provisions of the bill were intended to be a final disposition of all trust obligations and a final "dissolution of the tribal governments."

The original act was to have expired in 1962, but was amended twice to allow more time to sell the tribal assets. As time wore on, Belvin realized that the bill severed the tribe members' access to government loans and other services, including the tribal tax exemption. By 1967, he had asked Oklahoma Congressman Ed Edmondson to try to repeal the termination act. Public sentiment was changing as well. The Choctaw people had seen what termination could do to tribes, since they witnessed the process with four other tribes in Oklahoma: the Wyandotte Nation, Peoria Tribe of Indians of Oklahoma, Ottawa Tribe of Oklahoma, and Modoc Tribe of Oklahoma. In 1969, ten years after passage of the Choctaw termination bill and one year before the Choctaws were to be terminated, word spread throughout the tribe that Belvin's law was a termination bill. Outrage over the bill generated a feeling of betrayal, and tribal activists formed resistance groups opposing termination. Groups such as the Choctaw Youth Movement in the late 1960s fought politically against the termination law. They helped create a new sense of tribal pride, especially among younger generations. Their protest delayed termination; Congress repealed the law on 24 August 1970.

Self-determination 1970s-present

The 1970s were a crucial and defining decade for the Choctaw. To a large degree, the Choctaw repudiated the more extreme Indian activism. They sought a local grassroots solution to reclaim their cultural identity and sovereignty as a nation.

Republican President Richard Nixon, long sympathetic to American Indian rights, ended the government's push for termination. On August 24, 1970, he signed a bill repealing the Termination Act of 1959, before the Choctaw would have been terminated. Some Oklahoma Choctaw organized a grassroots movement to change the direction of the tribal government. In 1971, the Choctaw held their first popular election of a chief since Oklahoma entered the Union in 1907. Nixon stated the tribes had a right to determine their own destiny.

A group calling themselves the Oklahoma City Council of Choctaws endorsed thirty-one-year-old David Gardner for chief, in opposition to the current chief, seventy-year-old Harry Belvin. Gardner campaigned on a platform of greater financial accountability, increased educational benefits, the creation of a tribal newspaper, and increased economic opportunities for the Choctaw people. Amid charges of fraud and rule changes concerning age, Gardner was declared ineligible to run. He did not meet the new minimum age requirement of thirty-five. Belvin was re-elected to a four-year term as chief.

In 1975, thirty-five-year-old David Gardner defeated Belvin to become the Choctaw Nation's second popularly elected chief. 1975 also marked the year that the United States Congress passed the landmark Indian Self-Determination and Education Assistance Act, which had been supported by Nixon before he resigned his office due to the Watergate scandal. This law revolutionized the relationship between Indian Nations and the federal government by providing for nations to make contracts with the BIA, in order to gain control over general administration of funds destined for them.

Native American tribes such as the Choctaw were granted the power to negotiate and contract directly for services, as well as to determine what services were in the best interest of their people. During Gardner's term as chief, a tribal newspaper, Hello Choctaw, was established. In addition, the Choctaw directed their activism at regaining rights to land and other resources. With the Muscogee and Cherokee nations, the Choctaw successfully sued the federal and state government over riverbed rights to the Arkansas River.

Discussions began on the issue of drafting and adopting a new constitution for the Choctaw people. A movement began to increase official enrollment of members, increase voter participation, and preserve the Choctaw language. In early 1978, David Gardner died of cancer at the age of thirty-seven. Hollis Roberts was elected chief in a special election, serving from 1978 to 1997.

In June 1978 the Bishinik replaced Hello Choctaw'' as the tribal newspaper. Spirited debates over a proposed constitution divided the people. In May 1979, they adopted a new constitution for the Choctaw nation.

Faced with termination as a sovereign nation in 1970, the Choctaws emerged a decade later as a tribal government with a constitution, a popularly elected chief, a newspaper, and the prospects of an emerging economy and infrastructure that would serve as the basis for further empowerment and growth.

Notable tribal members

 Lane Adams (b. 1989), Major League Baseball player, Philadelphia Phillies (nephew of Choctaw member and attorney Kalyn Free)
 Marcus Amerman (b. 1959), bead, glass, and performance artist
 David W. Anderson, 9th Assistant Secretary of the Interior for Indian Affairs
 Jim Weaver Barnes (b. 1933), poet, writer, rancher, and former professor
 Gary Batton (b. 1966), Chief of the Choctaw Nation 
 Josh Brecheen (b. 1979), U.S. representative for Oklahoma's 2nd congressional district since 2023.
 Ada E. Brown (b. 1974), appointed by President Donald Trump to be a federal judge of the United States District Court for the Northern District of Texas
 Michael Burrage (b. 1950), former U.S. District Judge
 Sean Burrage (b. 1968), President of Southeastern Oklahoma State University 
 Steve Burrage (b. 1952), former Oklahoma State Auditor and Inspector
 Clarence Carnes (1927–1988), imprisoned at Alcatraz 
 Czarina Conlan (1871–1958), suffragist, first woman to represent the Choctaw in Washington, D.C., and first woman elected to a school board in Oklahoma
 Samantha Crain (b. 1986), singer-songwriter, musician
 Scott Fetgatter (b. 1968), Member of the Oklahoma House of Representatives from the 16th district
 John Hope Franklin (1915–2009), African-American historian whose mother was of partial Choctaw descent
 Tobias William Frazier, Sr. (1892–1975), Choctaw code talker
 Kalyn Free, attorney
 Rosella Hightower (1920–2008), prima ballerina
 Norma Howard (b. 1958), visual artist
 LeAnne Howe (b. 1951), writer and academic
 Phil Lucas (1942–2007), filmmaker
 Green McCurtain (d. 1910), Chief from 1902 to 1910 (appointed by US government 1906-1910)
 Cal McLish (1925–2010), Major League Baseball pitcher
 Devon A. Mihesuah (b. 1957), author, editor, historian
 Joseph Oklahombi (1895–1960), Choctaw code talker
 Peter Pitchlynn (1806–1881), Chief from 1860 to 1866
 Gregory E. Pyle (1949–2019), former Chief of the Choctaw Nation
 Hollis E. Roberts (1943–2011), former Chief of the Choctaw Nation 
 Oral Roberts (1918-2009), evangelist
 R. Trent Shores, United States Attorney for the Northern District of Oklahoma since 2017
 William Grady Stigler (1891-1952), U.S. Representative from Oklahoma 2nd District, 1944–52
 Bryan Terry (b. 1968), Member of the Tennessee House of Representatives from the 48th district
 Tim Tingle, writer and storyteller
 Wilma Victor (1919–1987), educator, first lieutenant in Women's Army Corps (1943-1946), special assistant to Secretary of the Interior Rogers Morton (1971-1975)
 Summer Wesley (b. 1981), attorney, writer, and activist
 Wallace Willis, composer of Negro spirituals, including Swing Low, Sweet Chariot and Roll, Jordan, Roll, Choctaw slave and Freedmen owned by Britt Willis
 Allen Wright (1826–1885), Chief from 1866 to 1870
 Muriel Hazel Wright (1889–1975), teacher, historian and writer, granddaughter of Chief Allen Wright

See also 

 Choctaw code talkers, World War I veterans who provided a secure means of communication in their language; first Native American code talkers
 Choctaw culture
 Choctaw mythology
 Choctaw Trail of Tears
 Jena Band of Choctaw Indians, Louisiana
 Mississippi Band of Choctaw Indians
 List of Indian reservations

Notes

References

External links
 Choctaw Nation of Oklahoma, official website
 Choctaw Nation Health Services Authority
 D. L. Birchfield, "Choctaws." Accessed May 15, 2015.

 
Native American tribes in Oklahoma
American Indian reservations in Oklahoma
1786 establishments in the United States
1830 establishments in the United States
Federally recognized tribes in the United States